Sangju Hwang clan is one of the Korean clans. Their Bon-gwan is in Sangju, North Gyeongsang Province. According to the research held in 2015, the number of Sangju Hwang clan’s member was 7685. Hwang Rak, a minister in Han dynasty, began Hwang clan in Korea. Hwang Rak had a shipwreck on his way to Vietnam when he was dispatched as an envoy in the 28 th year of Emperor Guangwu of Han period. Sangju Hwang clan’s founder was  who was a descendant of Hwang Rak and worked as a government post in great general in Goryeo period.

See also 
 Korean clan names of foreign origin

References

External links 
 

 
Korean clan names of Chinese origin
Hwang clans